is a Japanese football player. She plays for Mynavi Sendai Ladies in the WE League. She played for Japan national team.

Club career
Manya was born in Osaka Prefecture on November 5, 1996. After graduating from high school, she joined Vegalta Sendai (later Mynavi Vegalta Sendai) in 2015. However, she can not play in L.League competition for injury in 2015 and 2016 season. In 2017, she debuted in L.League and became a regular player as left side back.

National team career
In 2012, Manya was selected Japan U-17 national team for 2012 U-17 World Cup. On July 27, 2017, she debuted for Japan national team against Brazil. She played 7 games for Japan in 2017.

National team statistics

References

External links

Japan Football Association

1996 births
Living people
Association football people from Osaka Prefecture
Japanese women's footballers
Japan women's international footballers
Nadeshiko League players
Mynavi Vegalta Sendai Ladies players
Women's association football defenders